The United Kingdom's M64 motorway was planned during the 1970s to link the M6 at Stoke-on-Trent with the M1 near Castle Donington, by way of Uttoxeter and Derby.
Its purpose would have been to allow traffic travelling from the south-east to the north-west to avoid the busy M6 around Birmingham. It was cancelled in 1976.
During the 1990s, the A50 between Stoke and Derby was upgraded to dual carriageway instead, following roughly the same route as the middle section of the M64.  However, instead of terminating on the M6, the new dual carriageway terminated deep inside the urban area of Stoke on the A500, and at the eastern end, it terminated on the M1 further north than originally planned.
Meanwhile, the M6 Toll motorway was built to ease traffic congestion north of Birmingham.

The "M64" number had previously been reserved for the Manchester motorway that opened as the M602 in 1971.

See also
List of motorways in the United Kingdom

References

64
Cancelled highway projects in the United Kingdom